Burnley Football Club is an English professional association football club based in the town of Burnley, Lancashire. Founded on 18 May 1882, the club was one of the first to become professional (in 1883), putting pressure on the Football Association to permit payments to players. As a result, the team were able to enter the FA Cup for the first time in 1885–86, and were one of the twelve founding members of the Football League in 1888–89. Burnley have played in the top four tiers of English football from 1888 to the present day. The team have been champions of England twice, in 1920–21 and 1959–60, have won the FA Cup once, in 1913–14, and have won the FA Charity Shield twice, in 1960 and 1973. Burnley were the second, and are one of only five teams to have won all four professional divisions of English football, along with Wolverhampton Wanderers, Preston North End, Sheffield United and Portsmouth.

From 1882 to 1894, the Burnley team was selected by the board of directors or a committee whose secretary had the same powers and role as a manager has today. In August 1894, the club decided to follow other clubs and appoint a team manager. Burnley-born Harry Bradshaw was appointed; he had been involved with the club since its foundation in 1882 and he had been a committee member since 1887. Scotsman Frank Hill, who was in charge of Burnley from October 1948 to August 1954, was the first non-English manager in the club's history. From 1954 to 1983, under chairman Bob Lord, only managers with a previous playing career at the club were appointed—this trend ended when John Bond took the post in June 1983. Two Burnley managers have died in the job—Spen Whittaker and John Haworth.

The longest-serving person to manage Burnley is Harry Potts, who was in charge of the club for a total of 728 competitive matches: from February 1958 to February 1970 and from February 1977 to October 1979. Haworth and Potts are Burnley's most successful managers in terms of competitive honours won, as Haworth claimed one FA Cup (1913–14) and one First Division title (1920–21), while Potts won one First Division title (1959–60) and one Charity Shield (1960).

From the beginning of the club's official managerial records in 1894 to the present, Burnley have had 29 permanent managers and 6 caretakers. The club's current manager is Vincent Kompany, who was appointed in June 2022.

List of managers 
Information correct after match played on 13 November 2022. Only competitive matches are counted, except the abandoned 1939–40 Football League season and matches in Wartime Leagues and Cups.
Key
 Names of caretaker managers are supplied where known, and the names of caretaker managers are highlighted in italics and marked with an asterisk (*).
 Names of player-managers are supplied where known, and are marked with a double-dagger.

Notes

References 
General
 

Specific

 
Burnley F.C.